The parliamentary system is a part of the Constitution of Norway (§ 15), regarding the national level of administration and how the political executive branch should be formed. From the 1980s it has been used on the subnational levels as well; on the local (in municipalities) as well as regional level (in county municipalities).

Local level
Locally, the parliamentary system is used in two municipalities consisting of large cities: Norway's largest city and capital Oslo and Norway's second largest city Bergen. In practice, it has meant the forming of a new institution, the city government. In line with the parliamentary principle, this derives from the city council, which is elected in a municipal election. Also, the responsibility of preparing cases and proposals for the city council was transferred to the city government from the city's civic administration, which was headed by the chief administrative officer.

The city government institution was introduced in Oslo in 1986 as a test, and later became permanent. Oslo was said to be the first, and for many years only, city in Europe with a parliamentary system. Bergen followed in 2000. It has been proposed in Norway's third largest city Trondheim, but it has not happened. It has also been proposed in smaller municipalities like Askøy, Kristiansand, Skien, Harstad and Tromsø.

A member of the city government is called city commissioner, and the city government is led by a chairperson.

Regional level
A parliamentary system is used in the county municipalities of Hedmark, Nordland, Nord-Trøndelag, Troms—in addition to Oslo, which is both a municipality and a county. Nordland introduced the institution in 1999, and Troms, Hedmark and Nord-Trøndelag followed in 2003. The possibility was also researched by Vestfold in the 1990s, and it has been proposed in several counties, including Rogaland, Akershus, Sør-Trøndelag and Hordaland.

Similarly to the local level, the county government is called . The leader is called , and a cabinet member is called . This must not be confused with the position , the chief administrative officer of the county municipality.

References

Government of Norway
County administration of Norway

no:Parlamentarisme#Kommunal og fylkeskommunal parlamentarisme